Eucithara fusiformis is a small sea snail, a marine gastropod mollusk in the family Mangeliidae.

Description
The length of the shell varies between 12.7 mm and 16.3 mm.

The shell is yellowish white, stained or interruptedly fasciated with orange-brown. The outer lip has 13-14 teeth, the inner lip 17-18.

Distribution
This marine species occurs off the Philippines and Vanuatu.

References

  Reeve, L.A. 1846. Monograph of the genus Mangelia. pls 1-8 in Reeve, L.A. (ed). Conchologia Iconica. London : L. Reeve & Co. Vol. 3.

External links
  Tucker, J.K. 2004 Catalog of recent and fossil turrids (Mollusca: Gastropoda). Zootaxa 682:1-1295
 
 MNHN, Paris: Eucithara fusiformis

fusiformis
Gastropods described in 1846